An EMD GP60 is a 4-axle (B-B) diesel-electric locomotive built by General Motors Electro-Motive Division between 1985 and 1994. The GP60 was EMD's first engine that was classified as a "third-generation" locomotive. Hidden behind the electrical cabinet doors on the rear wall of the cab, the GP60 concealed a trio of microprocessors that monitored and managed a host of engine, cooling system and control functions. The engine's on-board microprocessors replaced hundreds of wiring circuits, dozens of relays and all but one module card, making it an improvement among EMD's engines.

Power was provided by a 16-cylinder 710G3A diesel engine, which could produce . This locomotive was 59 feet 9 inches long and featured a  fuel tank. The GP60 series shared the same frame as the GP59. Cabless 'B' units of this locomotive model were also built; they were known as GP60B models. Units built with a North American Safety Cab were designated GP60M. These latter two types were purchased exclusively by the Atchison, Topeka and Santa Fe Railway. A total of 294 GP60, 23 GP60B and 63 GP60M units were built by EMD. Due to the mainstream focus of railroads on powerful six-axle units, and strict emissions standards, aside from the collaborations with Motive Power Incorporated, the GP60 is the last new EMD "Geep".

Railroads and models
  
Santa Fe followed its 40 standard-cab GP60s with an order for 63 custom GP60Ms. The GP60M featured North American Safety cabs, and was the only 60 Series B-B locomotive with this feature. The nose has a headlight that is slightly offset to the right to accommodate the front door. The first new units delivered in the road's revived "Super Fleet" Warbonnet Paint Scheme. Santa Fe GP60Ms 100–162 were delivered between May and September 1990.

23 GP60 B units were built, all for Santa Fe. Taking advantage of the cabless configuration, the dynamic brake equipment on the GP60B was moved forward and away from the prime mover. Santa Fe 325–347 were the only GP60Bs. Some of these remain in service with BNSF; one of them, GP60B 347, was rebuilt into a standard GP60 by applying the cab of a Union Pacific SD40-2 to the locomotive in 2010. It was then renumbered to BNSF 170, though it was renumbered again to BNSF 200 in 2014.

Rio Grande's first (and last) 60 series units were GP60s 3154–3156, built to SP specs in May 1990.

Southern Pacific purchased the first, last, and largest fleet of GP60s, ordering 195 units between December 1987 and February 1994. Nearly half of the SP Fleet was lettered for subsidiary Cotton Belt, but an even hundred were directly Southern Pacific.

Two units built for the Texas Mexican Railway were returned to lessor Helm Financial after Kansas City Southern acquired the "Tex Mex". The pair operated for a while in lease service on CSX, then were briefly on the roster of the Vermont Railway System (VRS) as its 381–382 before that carrier deemed them unsuitable for its operations. 381 was even repainted into VRS red and white before being returned to Helm in 2004. These units were then sold to BNSF as No. 168 and No. 169.

Original owners

References

External links

 Sarberenyi, Robert. EMD GP60, GP60M, GP60B, and GP59 Original Owners

EMD 60 Series locomotives
GP60
B-B locomotives
Diesel-electric locomotives of the United States
Railway locomotives introduced in 1985
Locomotives with cabless variants
Freight locomotives
Standard gauge locomotives of the United States